Elah may refer to:

 Elah (Edom), the name of an Edomite clan
 Elah, a name of God in Judaism
 Elah, the father of Hoshea, the last king of the Israelite Kingdom of Israel 
 King Elah, the fourth king of Israel
 Valley of Elah, where the biblical David fought Goliath
 Elah, Hebrew word for "terebinth"
 Elah Terrell, an American architect

See also
 Allah, the Arabic word for God 
 El (disambiguation)
In the Valley of Elah, a 2007 film